Swamy is a 2004 Indian Telugu-language action drama film directed by VR Pratap and starring Harikrishna, Meena, Uma and Rajiv Kanakala.

Cast 

Harikrishna as Swamy 
Meena as Swamy's wife
Aamani as medical college principal
Uma as Seeta and Geeta
Rajiv Kanakala as Anand
Jaya Prakash Reddy
Tanikella Bharani
Mohan Raj
Nutan Prasad as judge
Jeeva
Banerjee
Raghu Babu
Chalapati Rao as taxi driver
Srinivasa Reddy
Duvvasi Mohan
Venu Madhav
Brahmanandam
Asha Saini (item number)

Production 
This film marks the return of Meena to a high-key Telugu film after a hiatus.

Soundtrack 
The soundtrack composed by M. M. Keeravani in his third collaboration with Harikrishna. The songs were well received.

Reception 
A critic from Sify opined that "On the whole the film has nothing new to offer". Jeevi of Idlebrain.com gave the film a rating of two out of five and wrote that "The plus points of the film are Hari Krishna and visual effects. The minus points are story, dialogues, screenplay and direction". Mithun Verma of Full Hyderabad said that "This has to be the best performance of Hari Krishna till date" and that "Where the movie lacks in originality, it makes up with some cool action sequences and some impressive con games the hero plays to deceive the court". A critic from Indiaglitz called the film a "letdown" and stated that "It has not even a single frame or idea which can be called original and new. It begins predictably, moves predictably and ends predictably".

References